Shake Harder Boy is an album by the American post-hardcore band Harkonen. It was released in 2002 by Hydra Head Records.

Track listing 
All tracks written by Harkonen.
 "Smile Pretty" – 1:43
 "Baristas Get Stalked" – 3:35
 "Bargains Only" – 3:47
 "Caseydrive" – 2:29
 "We've Come for Your Daughters" – 3:12
 "Smile Pretty" – 1:43
 "Easy Prey" – 3:18
 "All This Time I Thought Your Name Was Cool Dude" – 2:27
 "The Burly Spur" – 4:31
 "Your Name is Shit" – 2:17
 "Introducing the Creeker Sneaker" – 3:06
 "Settle Here" – 5:29

References 

2002 albums
Harkonen (band) albums
Hydra Head Records albums